Hebeloma ingratum is a species of mushroom in the family Hymenogastraceae.

ingratum
Fungi of Europe